Surrey Institute of Art & Design, University College (SIAD) was an art college in the United Kingdom from 1994 to 2005. It was formed from the merger of West Surrey College of Art and Design (1969–1995) and Epsom School of Art and Design (1893–1995). It merged with the Kent Institute of Art & Design on August 1, 2005 to form the University College for the Creative Arts at Canterbury, Epsom, Farnham and Rochester, now the University for the Creative Arts.

Evolution
The Farnham School of Art was founded in 1866. The Guildford School of Art followed in 1870. The two conjoined to become the West Surrey College of Art and Design in 1969. Epsom School of Art and Design was founded in 1893 as Epsom and Ewell Technical Institute and School of Art which later split into a separate Technical Institute and art school sometime before World War II. A new purpose built site was opened in Heathcote Road on Thursday 26 April 1973.

In 1994 there was a merger between and the West Surrey College of Art and Design and Epsom School of Art and Design, with the combined institution renamed the Surrey Institute of Art & Design a year later. These two former colleges formed the basis for the two main campuses of the school. In 1999, the college was granted university college status and took on its last name.

Until its 2005 merger it was the second largest specialist art and design institution in the country with the largest being the University of the Arts, London.  A 3,500 yearly student intake was reached during its final years. As with that institution and the more restricted, typically established professional intake to the Royal College of Art, Surrey Institute gained degree-awarding powers independent of a university. As such it was degree validating partner to The Arts Institute at Bournemouth.

UCA has now sold the Maidstone campus at Oakwood Park to MidKent college and has completely withdrawn from the location. However the University still also either validates or provides courses at Maidstone Studios (TV production) and the Royal School of Needlework at Hampton Court Palace.

Notable alumni

 Pamela Ascherson, sculptor and illustrator
 Piers Baker, cartoon illustrator and creator of the comic strip Ollie and Quentin

 Jason Barker, Professor of Cultural Studies Kyung Hee University and film director 
 Linda Barker, TV presenter
 Simon Basher, artist, illustrator and author
 Owen Bell, illustrator
 Stacy Bragger, Falkland Islands politician
 Simon Bor, Sara Bor (née Hirst) animation directors & producers
 Cecily Brown, painter
 Geoffrey Burnand, painter
 Davide Cinzi, cinematographer
 Jack Coutu, printmaker and sculptor
 Sue Darlow, documentary photographer and cycle adventurer
 Keith Devlin, Visual Effects Supervisor
 Michaël Dudok de Wit, animator
 Gareth Edwards, film director (Godzilla)
 Malika Favre (b. 1982, French illustrator)
 Anna Fox, documentary photographer
 Neil Haddon, painter
 David Hulin, animator and director
 Annabel Jankel, animator and film director
 Kathi Käppel, illustrator and animation director
 Kate MccGwire, sculptor who specializes in the medium of feathers
 Dominic Mitchell, screenwriter/playwright, creator of In The Flesh
 John Mollo, film costume designer (Star Wars, 1977)
 Morten Mørland, political cartoonist
 Lance Nielsen, writer and director, film and theatre
 Magdalene Odundo, potter
 Mrinalini Mukherjee, sculptor
 Cyriak Harris, animator
 Omeima Mudawi-Rowlings MBE, deaf British-Sudanese textile artist based in Brighton who is known for services to people with disabilities in the arts
 Grant Orchard, animator and director
 Daphne Padden (1927-2009), graphic designer
 Jimmy Page, Led Zeppelin
 Nigel Rolfe, performance artist
 Chris Shepherd, animator and director
 Suzie Templeton, animator and director
 Alan Thornhill, sculptor and former potter
 Darren Walsh, animator and director
 Mary Wondrausch, artist potter and writer

References

External links
 University for the Creative Arts  – official website

Epsom and Ewell
History of Surrey
University for the Creative Arts
Educational institutions established in 1994
1994 establishments in England
Defunct universities and colleges in England